American novelist Philip Caputo has also written a novel named "Acts of Faith"

Acts of Faith is the 1985 novel written by Rajiva Wijesinha. The book is the first in a trilogy that was followed by Days of Despair in 1987 and concludes with 2005's The Limits of Love.

Plot summary 
By Using the 1983 race riots in Sri Lanka as a background, Acts of Faith explores  social and political issues which characterize Sri Lanka and other Asian nations. The book provides a satirical critique of observed state-incited violence, manipulation of the media, caste and class rivalries.

At the same time, underneath the racy humour there is a close attention to personal motivations, particularly in terms of the family structures that dominate such societies.

References

1985 novels
Sri Lankan English-language novels
Novels set in Sri Lanka
Fiction set in 1983